Adriano Celentano (born 6 January 1938) is an Italian musician, singer, composer, actor, and filmmaker. He is dubbed il Molleggiato (the springy one) because of his dancing.

Celentano's many albums frequently enjoyed both commercial and critical success. With 150 million records sold worldwide, he is one of the best-selling italian musical artist.  Often credited as the author of both the music and lyrics of his songs, according to his wife Claudia Mori, some were written in collaboration with others. Due to his prolific career, both in Italy and abroad, he is considered one of the pillars of Italian music.
Celentano is recognized for being particularly perceptive of changes in the music business, and is credited for having introduced rock and roll to Italy. As an actor, Celentano has appeared in 39 films, mostly comedies.

Early life
Celentano was born in Milan at 14 Via Cristoforo Gluck, and this address later became the subject of the famous song "Il ragazzo della via Gluck" ("The boy from Gluck Street"). His parents were from Foggia in Apulia and had moved north for work. His career as a singer started in 1959. Before his debut as an artist he was working as a watchmaker.

Career

Heavily influenced by Elvis Presley and the 1950s rock 'n' roll scene as well as by American actor Jerry Lewis, Celentano started playing in a rock and roll band with Giorgio Gaber and Enzo Jannacci. Along with Gaber and Jannacci, he was discovered by Jolly Records A&R Executive Ezio Leoni, who signed him to his first recording contract and co-authored with Celentano some of his greatest early hits, including "24.000 baci", "Il tuo bacio è come un rock", and "Si è spento il Sole".
He first appeared on screen in Ragazzi del Juke-Box, a 1959 Italian musical film directed by Lucio Fulci with music by Ezio Leoni. In 1960, Federico Fellini cast him as a rock and roll singer in his film La Dolce Vita.

In 1962, Celentano founded the Italian record label Clan Celentano (which is still active) with many performers such as Don Backy, Ola & the Janglers, Ricky Gianco, Katty Line, Gino Santercole, Fred Bongusto and his wife Claudia Mori.

As a film director, Celentano frequently cast Ornella Muti, Eleonora Giorgi and his wife Claudia Mori. He and Mori have three children, Rosita, Giacomo and Rosalinda Celentano. Rosalinda is most notable to worldwide audiences for playing Satan in Mel Gibson's The Passion of the Christ. Celentano has also hosted several Italian television shows.

Celentano has retained his popularity in Italy for over 50 years, selling millions of records and appearing in numerous TV shows and movies. As part of his TV and movie work, he created a comic genre, with a characteristic walk and facial expressions. For the most part, his films were commercially successful; indeed, in the 1970s and part of the 1980s, his low-budget movies were top of Italian box office rankings. As an actor, critics point to Serafino (1968), directed by Pietro Germi, as his best performance.

He has released 40 albums, consisting of 29 studio albums, three live albums, and eight compilations. His most popular songs are "La coppia più bella del mondo", which sold over one million copies, and was awarded a gold disc; "Azzurro" (1968), written by Paolo Conte; "Svalutation" (1976), and "Prisencolinensinainciusol" (1972), which was written to mimic the way English sounds to non-English speakers despite being almost entirely nonsense.

Celentano was referenced in the 1979 Ian Dury and the Blockheads song and single, "Reasons to be Cheerful, Part 3", as one of the aforementioned "reasons to be cheerful", and in Fellini's 1986 film Ginger and Fred.

After 18 years without live performances, Celentano's 2012 live concert was broadcast on Mediaset channel Canale 5, attracting over 9 million viewers.

Personal life

Celentano has been a vegetarian since 2005 and has defended animal rights. A football fan, Celentano is a well-known Inter Milan supporter.

Discography

Albums
Studio albums

 1960: Adriano Celentano with Giulio Libano and his Orchestra – Jolly LPJ 5008
 1960: Furore – Jolly LPJ 5017
 1962: Peppermint Twist – Jolly LPJ 5021
 1963: A New Orleans – Jolly LPJ 5025
 1965: Non mi dir – Clan, ACC 40002
 1966: La festa – Clan, ACC 40006
 1966: Il ragazzo della via Gluck – Clan, ACC 40007
 1968: Azzurro/Una carezza in un pugno – Clan, ACC 40011
 1968: Adriano rock – Clan, BF 501
 1969: Le robe che ha detto Adriano – Clan, BF 502
 1969: Pioggia di successi
 1970: Il forestiero – Clan, BFM 700
 1971: Er più – Storia d'amore e di coltello – Clan, BFM 602
 1972: I mali del secolo – Clan, BFM 701
 1973: La storia di uno... Adriano Celentano
 1973: Nostalrock – Clan, CLN 65764
 1975: Yuppi du – Clan, CLN 69120
 1976: Svalutation – Clan, CLN 86013
 1977: Disco dance – Clan, CLN 86026
 1977: Tecadisk – Clan, CLN 86033
 1978: Ti avrò – Clan, CLN 20053
 1978: Geppo il folle – Clan, CLN 20099
 1979: Il concerto di Adriano – Clan, CLN 22203
 1979: Soli – Clan, CLN 20150
 1980: Un po' artista un po' no – Clan, CLN 20201
 1980: Tu non-mi lascerai
 1981: Deus – Clan, CLN 20257
 1982: Uh... uh... – Clan, CLN 20324
 1982: Storia d'amore
 1983: Atmosfera – Clan, CLN 20380
 1984: I miei americani – Clan, CLN 20445
 1985: Joan Lui – Clan, CLN 20485
 1986: I miei americani 2 – Clan, CLN 20545
 1987: La pubblica ottusità – Clan, CLN 20699
 1991: Il re degli ignoranti – Clan, 9031 74439-1
 1994: Quel punto – Clan, 4509 97319-1
 1996: Arrivano gli uomini – Clan, CLCD 74321 381192
 1998: Mina Celentano – Clan/PDU, 90011 (by Mina and Adriano Celentano)
 1999: Io non-so parlar d'amore – Clan, CLN 13641
 2000: Esco di rado e parlo ancora meno – Clan, CLN 20482
 2002: Per sempre – Clan, CLN 20511
 2004: C'è sempre un motivo – Clan, CLN 20551
 2005: C'è sempre un motivo + L'Indiano – Clan, CLN 20551
 2007: Dormi amore, la situazione non è buona – Clan, CLN 2058
 2011: Facciamo finta che sia vero – Clan, CLN 2098
 2016: Le Migliori – Clan, CLN ?
 2019: Adrian – Clan, CLN ?

Collection albums

 1969: Pioggia di successi – Clan, BF LP 506
 1970: Adriano hits – Clan, BF LP 600 nostal rock
 1973: La storia di uno...Adriano Celentano – Clan, CLN 68215
 1975: Il meglio di Adriano Celentano – Clan, CLN 69133
 1978: Celentanando – Clan, 1978 CGD / CLAN
 1979: Antologia ('57–'80) – Clan, CLN 22504
 1980: Il tempo se ne va compilation musica
 1982: Il cinema di Adriano – Clan, CLN 25037
 1983: Le volte che Adriano è stato primo – CLN 20391
 1988: Antologia '57–'87 (6 discs) – Clan, CLN 77002
 1992: Superbest – Clan, 4509 91216-1
 1995: Alla corte del ReMix – Clan, CLCD 74321 331042
 1997: Le origini di Adriano Celentano vol. 1 – RTI Music, 11611
 1997: Und immer Azzurro – Seine 20 größten Erfolge 1962–1997 – Clan, CD 74314905623
 1999: Le origini di Adriano Celentano vol. 2 – Clan, 496155
 2000: Questa è la storia di uno di noi (cofanetto)
 2001: Il cuore, la voce – Clan, CLN 20501
 2003: Le volte che Celentano è stato 1 – Clan, CLN 20521
 2003: TRE
 2005: Una stella in mezzo al ciel
 2006: Le più belle canzoni di Adriano Celentano
 2006: Unicamente Celentano – Clan, CLN 20571
 2008: L'animale – Clan
 2010: Il ribelle rock! – Sony Music
 2010: Il meglio di Adriano Celentano – NAR International
 2010: Antologia Italian Style – Venus Distribuzione
 2021: MinaCelentano – The Complete Recordings

Singles
45 rpms

 1958: "Rip It Up/Jailhouse Rock" – Music 2223
 1958: "Blueberry Hill/Tutti frutti" – Music 2224
 1958: "Man Smart/I Love You Baby" – Music 2232
 1958: "Tell Me That You Love Me/The Stroll" – Music 2233
 1958: "Happy Days Are Here Again/Buona sera signorina" – Jolly J 20032
 1958: "Hoola Hop Rock/La febbre dell'hoola hop" – Jolly J 20045
 1959: "Ciao ti dirò/Un'ora con te" – Jolly J 20057
 1959: "Il ribelle/Nessuno crederà" – Jolly J 20063
 1959: "Il tuo bacio è come un rock/I ragazzi del juke-box" – Jolly J 20064
 1959: "Teddy Girl/Desidero te" – Jolly J 20068
 1959: "Pronto pronto/Idaho" – Jolly J 20069
 1960: "Nikita Rock/Blue Jeans Rock" – Jolly J 20079
 1960: "Rock matto/Impazzivo per te" – Jolly J 20080
 1960: "Impazzivo per te/Crazy Rock" – Jolly J 20080
 1960: "Personality/Il mondo gira" – Jolly J 20089
 1960: "Così no/La gatta che scotta" – Jolly J 20090
 1960: "Piccola/Ritorna lo shimmy" – Jolly J 20092
 1960: "Pitagora/A cosa serve soffrire" – Jolly J 20106
 1960: "Giarrettiera rossa/Che dritta!" – Jolly J 20107
 1960: "Furore/Movimento di rock" – Jolly J 20124
 1961: "24 mila baci/Aulì-ulè" – Jolly J 20127
 1961: "Non esiste l'amor/Basta" – Jolly J 20137
 1961: "Gilly/Coccolona" – Jolly J 20144
 1961: "Nata per me/Non essere timida" – Jolly J 20150
 1962: "Forse forse/Peppermint Twist" – Jolly J 20153
 1962: "Ciao amore/Veleno" – Caramba Jolly C 11000
 1962: "Si è spento il sole/La mezza luna" – Jolly J 20178
 1962: "Stai lontana da me/Sei rimasta sola/Amami e baciami" – Clan, ACC 24001
 1962: "24 mila baci/Il tuo bacio è come un rock" – Jolly J 20185
 1962: "Pregherò (prima parte)/Pasticcio in Paradiso" – Clan, ACC 24005
 1963: "A New Orleans/Un sole caldo caldo caldo" – Jolly J 20197
 1963: "Il tangaccio/Grazie, prego, scusi" – Clan, ACC 24009
 1963: "Serafino campanaro/Ehi stella" – Jolly J 20220
 1963: "Sabato triste/Le notti lunghe" – Clan, ACC 24012
 1964: "Una notte vicino al mare/Hello Mary Lou" – Jolly J 20228
 1964: "Non mi dir/Non piangerò" – Clan, ACC 24015
 1964: "Il problema più importante/È inutile davvero" – Clan, ACC 24016
 1964: "L'angelo custode/Bambini miei" – Clan, ACC 24019
 1965: "Ciao ragazzi/Chi ce l'ha con me" – Clan, ACC 24022
 1965: "Sono un simpatico/E voi ballate/Due tipi come noi" – Clan, ACC 24024
 1965: "La festa/Ringo" – Clan, ACC 24027
 1966: "Il ragazzo della via Gluck"/"Chi era lui" – Clan, ACC 24032
 1966: "Mondo in mi 7a/Una festa sui prati" – Clan, ACC 24040
 1967: "La coppia più bella del mondo/Torno sui miei passi" – Clan, ACC 24051
 1967: "Tre passi avanti/Eravamo in 100.000" – Clan, ACC 24058
 1967: "30 donne nel west/Più forte che puoi" – Clan, ACC 24063
 1968: "Canzone/Un bimbo sul leone" – Clan, ACC 24073
 1968: "Azzurro/Una carezza in un pugno" – Clan, ACC 24080
 1968: "L'attore/La tana del re" – Clan, BF 69001
 1969: "La storia di Serafino/La pelle" – Clan, BF 69013
 1969: "Storia d'amore/Straordinariamente" – Clan, BF 69014
 1969: "Lirica d'inverno/L'uomo nasce nudo" – Clan, BF 69030
 1970: "Chi non lavora non fa l'amore/Due nemici innamorati" – Clan, BF 69040
 1970: "Chi non lavora non fa l'amore /EA" – Clan, BF 69041
 1970: "Viola/Se sapevo non-crescevo" – Clan, BF 69051
 1971: "Sotto le lenzuola/Il forestiero" – Clan, BF 70000
 1971: "Una storia come questa/Brutta" – Clan, BF 70010
 1971: "Er più/Una storia d'amore e di coltello" – Clan, BF 70015
 1972: "Un albero di trenta piani/Forse eri meglio di lei" – Clan, BF 70018
 1972: "La ballata di Pinocchio/I Will Drink the Wine" – Clan, BF 70022
 1972: "Prisencolinensinainciusol"/"Disc Jockey" – Clan, BF 70026
 1973: "L'unica chance/Quel signore del piano di sopra" – Clan, CLN 1319
 1973: "Only You/We're Gonna Move" – Clan, CLN 1887
 1974: "Bellissima/Stringimi a te" – Clan, CLN 2443
 1975: "Yuppi du/La ballata" – Clan, CLN 3208
 1975: "Un'altra volta chiudi la porta/Do dap" – Clan, CLN 3633
 1976: "Svalutation/La barca" – Clan, CLN 4375
 1977: "A Woman in Love/Rock Around the Clock/Don't Play That Song (You Lied)" – Clan, CLN 5048
 1977: "When Love/Somebody Save Me" – Clan, CLN 5403
 1978: "Ti avrò/La moglie, l'amante, l'amica" – Clan, CLN 10089
 1979: "Che cosa ti farei/Geppo" – Clan, CLN 10120
 1979: "Soli/Io e te" – Clan, CLN 10174
 1980: "Qua la mano/Gocce d'acqua" – Clan, CLN 10251
 1980: "Il tempo se ne va/Non se ne parla nemmeno" – Clan, CLN 10252
 1980: "Innamorata, incavolata a vita/Se non è amore" – Clan, CLN 10305
 1981: "L'artigiano (1ª parte)/L'artigiano (2ª parte)" – Clan, CLN 10326
 1982: "Crazy Movie/Roma che fa...te innamora" – Clan, CLN 10371
 1982: "Uel mae sae/We're Gonna Move" – Clan, CLN 10393
 1982: "Uh...uh.../Jungla di città" – Clan, CLN 10442
 1984: "Susanna/Il cantante folle" – Clan, CLN 23001
 1987: "Mi attrai/La luce del sole" – Clan, CLN 10786

More singles

 1995: "Voglio prendere il sole"
 1995: "Prisencolinensinainciusol (Remixes – maxi single)
 1996: "Cosi come sei"
 1996: "Arrivano gli uomini"
 1996: "Solo da un quarto d'ora"
 1998: "Acqua e sale"
 1998: "Brivido felino"
 1998: "Che taggia dì"
 1999: "Gelosia"
 1999: "L'emozione non-ha voce"
 1999: "L'uomo di cartone"
 1999: "Una rosa pericolosa"
 1999: "Qual è la direzione"
 1999: "Mi domando"
 1999: "L'arcobaleno"
 2000: "Senz'amore"
 2000: "Le pesche d'inverno"
 2000: "Per averti"
 2001: "Apri il cuore"
 2001: "Ti prenderò"
 2001: "Quello che non-ti ho detto mai"
 2001: "Tir"
 2001: "Le stesse cose"
 2002: "Confessa"
 2003: "Per sempre"
 2003: "Più di un sogno"
 2003: "Mi fa male"
 2004: "C'è sempre un motivo"
 2004: "Marì Marì"
 2005: "Ancora vivo"
 2005: "Valeva la pena"
 2005: "L'indiano"
 2006: "Oh Diana"
 2007: "Hai bucato la mia vita"
 2007: "La situazione non è buona"
 2008: "Dormi amore"
 2008: "Fiori"
 2008: "Aria...non-sei più tu"
 2008: "Sognando Chernobyl"
 2008: "La cura"
 2011: "Non ti accorgevi di me"
 2011: "Non so più cosa fare"
 2011: "Ti penso e cambia il mondo"
 2012: "Anna parte"
 2012: "La cumbia di chi cambia"
 2013: "Ti fai del male"
 2013: "Io non-ricordo (da quel giorno tu)"
 2013: "Mai nella vita"

Filmography

See also

 Cavatappi
 List of best-selling music artists

References

External links

 Official website
 
 Adriano Celentano discography at imusic.am
 The complete Adriano Celentano discography (from Music City)
  Adriano Celentano – Russian Pages
  Adriano Celentano – International
  Unofficial fanclub
 Adriano Celentano Filmography

1938 births
20th-century Italian comedians
20th-century Italian male actors
20th-century Italian male singers
Living people
David di Donatello winners
Folk-pop singers
Italian baritones
Italian buskers
Italian dance musicians
Italian male comedians
Italian male film actors
Italian male songwriters
Italian rock musicians
Italian rock singers
Nastro d'Argento winners
People of Apulian descent
Rock and roll musicians
Sanremo Music Festival winners
Singers from Milan
Symphonic rock musicians